Jeong Dojeon (Korean: 정도전, Hanja: 鄭道傳, 1342 – October 6, 1398), also known by his pen name Sambong (Korean: 삼봉), was a prominent Korean scholar-official during the late Goryeo to the early Joseon periods. He served as the first Chief State Councillor of Joseon, from 1392 until 1398 when he was killed by Yi Bang-won, the fifth son of Yi Seong-gye, the founder of the Joseon dynasty. Jeong Dojeon was an adviser to Yi Seong-gye and also the principal architect of the Joseon dynasty's policies, laying down the kingdom's ideological, institutional, and legal frameworks which would govern it for five centuries.

Family 
 Great-Grandfather
 Jeong Yeong-chan (정영찬, 鄭英粲)
 Grandfather
 Jeong Gyun (정균, 鄭均)
Father
 Jeong Woon-gyeong (정운경, 鄭云敬) (1305 - 1366)
Mother
 Lady Woo of Yeongju Woo clan (증 정경부인 영주 우씨, 贈 貞敬夫人 榮州 禹氏)
 Grandfather - Woo Yeon (우연, 禹淵)
 Siblings
 Younger sister - Lady Jeong of the Bonghwa Jeong clan (봉화 정씨)
 Brother-in-law - Hwang Yu-jeong (황유정, 黃有定) of the Pyeonghae Hwang clan (평해 황씨, 平海 黃氏) (1343 - 1421)
 Younger brother - Jeong Do-joon (정도존, 鄭道存) (? - 1398)
 Younger brother - Jeong Do-bok (정도복, 鄭道復) (1351 - 1435)
 Nephew - Jeong Dam (정담, 鄭澹)
 Nephew - Jeong Gi (정기, 鄭淇)
Wife
 Princess Gyeongsuk, Lady Choi of the Gyeongju Choi clan (경숙택주 경주 최씨, 慶淑宅主 慶州 崔氏)
Son - Jeong Jin (정진, 鄭津) (1361 - 1427)
 Daughter-in-law - Lady Seong of the Yeonil Seong clan (정부인 연일 성씨, 正夫人 延日 成氏)
Grandson - Jeong Rae (정래, 鄭來)
Grandson - Jeong Suk (정속, 鄭束)
 Great-Grandson - Jeong Mun-hyeong (정문형, 鄭文炯) (1427 - 1501)
Son - Jeong Yeong (정영, 鄭泳) (? - 1398)
Son - Jeong Yu (정유, 鄭遊) (? - 1398)

Life

Background and early career
Jeong Dojeon was born from a noble family, the Bonghwa Jeong clan (봉화 정씨, 奉化 鄭氏), in Yeongju in what is now South Korea. His family had emerged from commoner status some four generations before, and slowly climbed up the ladder of government service. His father was the first in the family to obtain a high post. Despite all his difficulties, he became a student of Yi Je-hyeon and along with other leading thinkers of the time, such as Jeong Mong-ju, his penetrating intelligence started to affect the Korean politics.

Relationship with Yi Seong-gye
Jeong Dojeon's ties with Yi Seong-gye and the foundation of Joseon were extremely close. He is said to have compared his relationship to Yi Seong-gye, to that between Zhang Liang and Emperor Gaozu of Han. Jeong Dojeon's political ideas had a lasting impact on Joseon Dynasty politics and laws.
The two first became acquainted in 1383, when Jeong Dojeon visited Yi Seong-gye at his quarters in Hamgyong province. After Yi Seong-gye (Taejo of Joseon) founded Joseon in July 1392, he appointed Jeong Dojeon to the highest civilian and military office simultaneously, entrusting him with all necessary power to establish the new dynasty. Deciding all policies from military affairs, diplomacy, and down to education, he laid down Joseon's political system and tax laws, replaced Buddhism with Confucianism as national religion, moved the capital from Gaeseong to Hanyang (present-day Seoul), changed the kingdom's political system from feudalism to highly centralized bureaucracy, and wrote a code of laws that eventually became Joseon's constitution. He even decided the names of each palace, eight provinces, and districts in the capital. He also worked to free many slaves and reformed land policy.

Conflict with Yi Bang-won
After Joseon was established in July 1392, Jeong Dojeon soon collided with Yi Bang-won over the question of choosing the crown prince, the future successor to Yi Seong-gye (Taejo of Joseon). Of all princes, Yi Bang-won contributed most to his father's rise to power and expected to be appointed as the crown prince even though he was Taejo's fifth son. However, Jeong Dojeon persuaded Taejo to appoint his young eighth son Yi Bang-seok (Yi Bang-won's half-brother) as the crown prince. Their conflict arose because Jeong Dojeon saw Joseon as a kingdom led by ministers while the king was to be largely symbolic figure, whereas Yi Bang-won wanted to establish the absolute monarchy ruled directly by the king. Both sides were well aware of each other's great animosity and were getting ready to strike first. After the sudden death of Queen Sindeok in 1398, while King Taejo was still in mourning for her (his second wife and mother of Yi Bang-seok), Yi Bang-won struck first by raiding the palace and killed Jeong Dojeon and his supporters as well as Queen Sindeok's two sons including the crown prince, in a coup that came to be known as the First Strife of Princes. Taejo, who helplessly watched his favorite sons and ministers being killed by Yi Bang-won's forces, abdicated in disgust and remained angry with Yi Bang-won well after Yi Bang-won became the third king of Joseon, Taejong of Joseon.

For much of Joseon history, Jeong Dojeon was vilified or ignored despite his contribution to its founding. He was finally rehabilitated in 1865 in recognition of his role in designing Gyeongbokgung (main palace). Earlier Jeongjo published a collection of Jeong Dojeon's writings in 1791. Jeong Dojeon's once-close friend and rival Jeong Mong-ju, who was assassinated by Yi Bang-won for remaining loyal to Goryeo Dynasty, was honored by Yi Bang-won posthumously and was remembered as symbol of loyalty throughout the Joseon Dynasty despite being its most determined foe.

Intellectual activity
Jeong Dojeon was a major opponent of Buddhism at the end of the Goryeo period. He was a student of Zhu Xi's thought. Using Cheng-Zhu school's Neo-Confucian philosophy as the basis of his anti-Buddhist polemic, he criticized Buddhism in a number of treatises as being corrupt in its practices, and nihilistic and antinomian in its doctrines. The most famous of these treatises was the Bulssi Japbyeon ("Array of Critiques Against Buddhism"). He was a founding member of the Sungkyunkwan, the royal Confucian academy, and one of its early faculty members.

Jeong Dojeon was among the first Korean scholars to refer to his thought as Silhak, or "practical learning." However, he is not usually numbered among the members of the silhak tradition, which arose much later in the Joseon period.

Political thought
Jeong Dojeon argued that the government, including the king himself, exists for the sake of the people. Its legitimacy could only come from benevolent public service. It was largely on this basis that he legitimized the overthrow of the Goryeo dynasty, arguing that the Goryeo rulers had given up their right to rule.

Jeong Dojeon divided society into three classes: (a) a large lower class of agricultural laborers and craftsmen, (b) a middle class of literati, and (c) a small upper class of bureaucrats. Anyone outside this system, including Buddhist monks, shamans, and entertainers, he considered a "vicious" threat to the social fabric.

Reception 
Right after his death, he had been criticized as a betrayer of the Goryeo dynasty and a greedy politician who attempted to take power from his king. For the next 300 years, he had been regarded as a treacherous villain. For example, Song Siyeol, the most reputable philosopher of the 15th century Joseon dynasty, always included a word "insidious" when he mentioned about Jeong Dojeon. Yi Ik, also a renowned Korean philosopher of the Middle Age of the dynasty, referred to him as "a figure who deserved to be killed" in his book, Seong Ho Sa Seol.

However, with the surge of revisionism in the 18th century, his work started to be assessed with a different angle. Jeongjo, 22nd King of Joseon, republished Sambong Jip, recognizing his work building the political systems and intellectual foundations of the dynasty.

Works
Sambong Jip (삼봉집, 三峯集), a three-chapter collection of poetry
Joseon Gyeong Gukjeon (조선경국전, 朝鮮經國典)
Daemyeongryul Joseoneohae (대명률조선어해, 大明律朝鮮語解)
Gyeongje Mungam (경제문감, 經濟文鑑)
Bulssi Japbyeon (불씨잡변, 佛氏雜辨)
Simmun Cheondap (심문천답, 心問天答)
Simgiri (심기리, 心氣理)
Hakja Jinamdo (학자지남도, 學者指南圖)
Jinmaek Dogyeol (진맥도결, 診脈圖結)
Goryeo Guksa (고려국사, 高麗國史)
Jin Beop (진법, 陣法)
goryeosa (고려사, 高麗史)

English translations

In addition, the translation of his Chinese poem "Plum" is included in

In popular culture
Portrayed by Lee Ho-jae in the 1983 MBC TV series 500 Years of Joseon: The King of Chudong Palace.
Portrayed by Kim Heung-gi in the 1996-1998 KBS1 TV series Tears of the Dragon.
Portrayed by Baek Seung-hyeon in the 2012-2013 SBS TV series The Great Seer.
Portrayed by Cho Jae-hyun and Kang Yi-seok in the 2014 KBS1 series Jeong Dojeon.
Portrayed by Ahn Nae-sang in the 2014 film The Pirates.
Portrayed by Kim Myung-min in the 2015-2016 SBS TV series Six Flying Dragons.
 Portrayed by Lee Kwang-gi in the 2021-22 KBS1 TV series Taejong Yi Bang-won.

See also
List of Korean philosophers
Korean philosophy
Korean literature
Joseon Dynasty politics

References

Jeong Dojeon, Jeong Byeong-cheol. Sam Bong jeep vol. 1-4. Hangookhansooljeongbo co.(2009) .
Jeong Byeong-cheol, Jeong Dojeon's was born true and fabrication. kyobomungo pupol (2013).
Han Yeong-u (1974). Jeong Dojeon's philosophy of political reform. Korea Journal 14 (7-8). Reprinted in Lee et al. (2004), Korean philosophy: Its tradition and modern transformation, pp.  55–74. Seoul: Hollym. .
Korean Institute of Philosophical Thought (1995). 강좌 한국철학 (Gangjwa Hanguk Cheolhak, Guide to Korean philosophy''), pp.  333–345. Seoul: Yemoon Seowon. .

External links
"정도전은 철학·권력 결합한 위대한 정치인" - 한겨레
Jeong Dojeon at Nate

Joseon people
Korean Confucianists
People murdered in Korea
Korean educators
Neo-Confucian scholars
Critics of Buddhism
People from Yeongju
1342 births
1398 deaths
14th-century Korean poets
14th-century Korean calligraphers
14th-century Korean philosophers